Andy Pratt (born January 25, 1947) is an American rock singer, songwriter and multi-instrumentalist. In the 1970s, he made a number of experimental records, of which "Avenging Annie" was a commercial hit.

Career
Pratt's demo recording of Avenging Annie was given to the Brown University radio station WBRU in 1972. In early 1973, Pratt signed to Columbia Records by Clive Davis. He went into Aengus Studios, of Fayville, Massachusetts and released Andy Pratt in 1973, which had modest commercial success. The single, Avenging Annie, peaked at number 78 on the Billboard Hot 100, spending ten weeks on the chart. The song was re-recorded by The Who singer Roger Daltrey for his album One of the Boys in 1977. Pratt's original version of the single became the B side of Bruce Springsteen's "Blinded by the Light" on a CBS promotional disc, and was used on the soundtrack to the film Velvet Goldmine in 1998.

Rolling Stone magazine said of his 1976 album, Resolution, "The songs carry rock harmony one step beyond the Beach Boys and the Stones." In 1982 Pratt released the mini album Fun in the First World produced by Leroy Radcliffe and released on Boston's Enzone Records. The mini album was later included on The Age of Goodbye.

Discography 

 Records Are Like Life (Polydor Records, 1969, reissued 1971)
 Andy Pratt (Columbia Records, 1973)
 Resolution (Nemperor Records, distributed by Atlantic Records, 1976)
 Shiver in the Night (Nemperor, 1977)
 Motives (Nemperor, distributed by Epic Records, 1979)
 Fun in the First World (Enzone Records, 1982)
 Not Just for Dancing (Lamborghini Records, 1983)
 Perfect Therapy (GMI, 1986)
 Life (GMI, 1988)
 One Body (GMI, 1991)
 Fire of Love (GMI, 1993)
 Resolution: The Andy Pratt Collection (Razor & Tie Records, compilation, 1996)
 Another World (Highway Records, 1998)
 Heaven and Earth (itsaboutmusic.com, 2003)
 I'm All Right (itsaboutmusic.com, 2003)
 Cover Me (itsaboutmusic.com, February 2003)
 New Resolutions (itsaboutmusic.com, August 2003)
 Andy Pratt Is Back (itsaboutmusic.com, 2003)
 Andy Pratt Solo (itsaboutmusic.com, 2003)
 Live : Recorded Live at The Village Underground, NYC 3/11/03 (itsaboutmusic.com, 2003)
 Age of Goodbye (Fun in the First World + Not Just for Dancing +2, CoraZong Records, 2004)
 Runaway Heart (itsaboutmusic.com, 2006)
 Masters of War (itsaboutmusic.com, 2008)
 Andy Pratt Loves You (Forward motion records, 2010)
 Life and Death (Forward motion records, 2011)
 Chasing Shadows (Forward motion records, 2013)
 The Wolf (independent, 2013)
 The New Normal? (Forward motion records, 2014)
 Do You Remember Me? (Continental Record Services, 2015)

References

External links
 Andy Pratt on It's About Music
 Andy Pratt on SoundCloud
 
 
 

1947 births
American male singers
American performers of Christian music
American rock singers
Atlantic Records artists
Buckingham Browne & Nichols School alumni
Charles Pratt family
Columbia Records artists
Converts to Christianity
Epic Records artists
Harvard University alumni
Living people
Musicians from Boston
Polydor Records artists
Singers from Massachusetts